Old Presbyterian Church (also known as First Presbyterian Church and the Barnwell Circle Theatre) is a historic church building at 1905 Academy Street in Barnwell, South Carolina.

It was built in 1848 in a Greek Revival style. The building was added to the National Register of Historic Places in 1972. The building is now home to the Circle Theater of the Barnwell County Performing Arts Center.

References

External links
Barnwell Circle Theatre

Presbyterian churches in South Carolina
Churches on the National Register of Historic Places in South Carolina
Churches completed in 1848
19th-century Presbyterian church buildings in the United States
Churches in Barnwell County, South Carolina
National Register of Historic Places in Barnwell County, South Carolina